The Armed Police Battalion is a specialised unit of the Bangladesh Police. It is headquartered in Dhaka.

History
The Armed Police Battalion was formed on 1 October 1975 as a specialized force of the Bangladesh Police through The Armed Police Battalion Ordinance 1979. The unit has 11 battalions under its command and the Special Security and Protection Battalion has two battalions. On 21 June 2011 Armed Police Battalion launched its first all women personal unit. Officers from the Armed Police Battalion have received training at the National Security Guard Centre in India as a part of a government plan in the aftermath of the July 2016 Dhaka attack to form a commando units in every police range and metropolitan area in Bangladesh.

References

1975 establishments in Bangladesh
Organisations based in Dhaka
Law enforcement agencies of Bangladesh
Police units of Bangladesh